Oxychilus albuferensis is a species of air-breathing land snail, a terrestrial pulmonate gastropod mollusk in the family Oxychilidae, the glass snails.

Distribution 
This species occurs in Majorca.

References

Oxychilus
Gastropods described in 2007
Endemic fauna of the Balearic Islands